Yello is a Swiss electronic music band, which formed in Zürich in 1979. For most of the band's history, Yello has been a duo consisting of Dieter Meier and Boris Blank; founding member Carlos Perón left in 1983.

Their sound is often characterised by unusual music samples and a heavy reliance on rhythm, with Meier as vocalist and lyricist, and Blank providing the music. Among their best known singles are "Oh Yeah" (1985), which has appeared in many films and television shows including Ferris Bueller's Day Off, The Secret of My Success, Uncle Buck and The Simpsons; and "The Race" (1988), which peaked at number 7 on the UK Singles Chart. The band has released 14 studio albums since 1980.

Band history

The band was formed by Boris Blank (keyboards, sampling, percussion, backing vocals) and Carlos Perón (tapes) in the late 1970s. Dieter Meier (vocals, lyrics), a millionaire industrialist and gambler, was brought in when the two founders realised that they needed a singer. The new band's name, Yello, was chosen as a neologism based on a comment made by Meier, "a yelled Hello".

Yello's first release was the 1979 single "I.T. Splash". The LP Solid Pleasure, featuring the original short version of "Bostich" (extended to a hit dance single in 1981), was released in November 1980. Yello's first video was made for the song "Pinball Cha Cha" in 1981; this was included in a 1985 video exhibit at Museum of Modern Art in New York. In early 1983, just after release of You Gotta Say Yes to Another Excess, Perón left Yello in order to pursue a solo career.

The band's fourth studio album Stella went No. 1 in Switzerland in 1985 as the first album ever by a Swiss group to top the Swiss album chart. It also appeared inside the German top 10 gaining gold status. The song "Oh Yeah" from the album gained the band worldwide attention the following year, after it prominently appeared in the 1986 film Ferris Bueller's Day Off and then a year later in The Secret of My Success. The song was released shortly after and became the band's only single to chart in the US, reaching No. 51, and their only top 50 hit in Australia, reaching No. 9.

In 1988, single "The Race" from the album Flag reached No. 7 in the UK as their only top 10 hit there. It featured in the film Nuns on the Run.

In 1995, a tribute remix album Hands on Yello was released featuring remixes by Moby, the Orb, Carl Craig, Carl Cox, the Grid and WestBam.

In 2005, Yello re-released their early albums Solid Pleasure, Claro Que Si, You Gotta Say Yes to Another Excess, Stella, One Second and Flag, all with bonus tracks, as part of the Yello Remaster Series.

A documentary on Yello, Electro Pop Made in Switzerland, directed by Anka Schmid, premiered at the Riff Raff cinema in Zürich in September 2005.

Yello was commissioned to produce music for the launch of the Audi A5 at the Geneva Motor Show in March 2007 and for the Audi A5 commercial in May 2007.

Musical style
Yello's sound is mainly characterised by unusual music samples, a heavy reliance on rhythm and Dieter Meier's dark voice. Yello makes heavy use of sampling in the construction of rhythm tracks, such as in "The Race" from 1988. Boris Blank has taken a couple of vocal turns; on "Swing" (from You Gotta Say Yes to Another Excess) and "Blazing Saddles" (from Flag). Guest vocalists have included Rush Winters, Billy Mackenzie, Stina Nordenstam, Jade Davies, Shirley Bassey, Heidi Happy and FiFi Rong. The group has shared writing credit with Mackenzie, Winters and Happy.

Yello rarely uses samples from previously released music; nearly every instrument has been sampled and re-engineered by Boris Blank, who over the years has built up an original sample library of thousands of named and categorised sounds.

Discography

Solid Pleasure (1980)
Claro Que Si (1981)
You Gotta Say Yes to Another Excess (1983)
Stella (1985)
One Second (1987)
Flag (1988)
Baby (1991)
Zebra (1994)
Pocket Universe (1997)
Motion Picture (1999)
The Eye (2003)
Touch Yello (2009)
Toy (2016)
Point (2020)

Literature
Boris Blank/Dieter Meier: Oh Yeah / Yello 40, Edition Patrick Frey, 2021, Zurich. ISBN 978-3-907236-35-2.

References

External links

 Review album Point at HIFI-TODAY
 
 

Musical groups established in 1979
Swiss dance music groups
Swiss electronic music groups
Swiss new wave musical groups
Synth-pop new wave musical groups
Techno music groups
Elektra Records artists
Island Records artists
Mercury Records artists
Polydor Records artists
Smash Records artists
Stiff Records artists
Vertigo Records artists